Abba is an Italian surname. Notable people with the surname include:

Bérangère Abba (born 1976), French politician
Cele Abba (1906–1992), Italian stage and film actress
 Dimi Mint Abba (1958–2011), Mauritanian musician
 Giuseppe Cesare Abba (1838–1910), Italian patriot and writer
 Marta Abba (1900–1988), Italian stage actress

See also 
 Raba Bar Jeremiah, also called "Abba", Jewish Talmudist

References 

Italian-language surnames